John Eider Castillo Diago (born September 21, 1983) is a Colombian footballer who currently plays for UES in El Salvador.

External links
 Profile - El Gráfico o

1983 births
Living people
Colombian footballers
Atlético Huila footballers
FBC Melgar footballers
Cortuluá footballers
C.D. Dragón footballers
C.D. Vista Hermosa footballers
Alianza F.C. footballers
Platense F.C. players
Colombian expatriate footballers
Expatriate footballers in Peru
Expatriate footballers in El Salvador
Expatriate footballers in Guatemala
Expatriate footballers in Honduras
Association football forwards